Cychrus zhoui is a species of ground beetle in the subfamily of Carabinae. It was described by Imura, Su & Osawa in 1998.

References

zhoui
Beetles described in 1998